Kilkeel is a civil parish in County Down, Northern Ireland. It is situated in the historic barony of Mourne.

Settlements
The civil parish contains the following settlements:
Annalong
Atticall
Dunnaval
Kilkeel

Townlands
Kilkeel civil parish contains the following townlands:

Aghyoghill
Attical
Aughnahoory
Aughnaloopy
Aughrim
Ballaghanery
Ballaghanery Upper
Ballinran
Ballinran Upper
Ballyardel
Ballygowan
Ballykeel
Ballymadeerfy
Ballymagart
Ballymageogh
Ballymartin
Ballynahatten
Ballyrogan (also known as Mourne Park)
Ballyveagh Beg
Ballyveagh Beg Upper
Ballyveagh More
Ballyveagh More Upper
Benagh Lower
Benagh Upper
Brackenagh East
Brackenagh East Upper
Brackenagh West
Brackenagh West Upper
Carrigenagh
Carrigenagh Upper
Corcreaghan
Cranfield
Derryoge
Drumcro
Drumindoney
Drummanlane
Drummanmore
Dunnaman
Dunnaval
Glasdrumman
Glasdrumman Upper
Glenloughan
Glenloughan Upper
Grange
Greencastle
Guineways
Guineways Upper
Kilkeel
Leitrim
Leitrim Upper
Lisnacree
Lisnagree Upper
Lurganconary
Lurganreagh
Magheramurphy
Maghereagh
Maghery
Moneydorragh Beg
Moneydorragh More
Moneydorragh More Upper
Mourne Mountains East
Mourne Mountains Middle
Mourne Mountains West
Mourne Park (also known as Ballyrogan)
Moyad
Moyad Upper
Mullartown
Mullartown Upper
Tullyframe

See also
List of civil parishes of County Down

References